Relations between the United States and Vietnam have historically been complex and have repeatedly switched back and forth between positive and negative, but the United States and Vietnam share warm diplomatic relations in the present.

Formal relations between the two countries were first initiated in the 19th century under U.S. President Andrew Jackson, but relations soured after the U.S. refused to protect the Kingdom of Vietnam from French invasion. During World War II, the U.S. covertly assisted the Viet Minh in fighting Japanese forces in French Indochina, though a formal alliance was not established. After the dissolution of French Indochina in 1954, the U.S. supported the capitalist South Vietnam as opposed to communist North Vietnam and fought North Vietnam directly during the Vietnam War. After American withdrawal in 1973 and the subsequent fall of South Vietnam in 1975, the U.S. applied a trade embargo and severed ties with Vietnam, mostly out of concerns relating to Vietnamese boat people and the Vietnam War POW/MIA issue. Attempts at re-establishing relations went unfulfilled for decades, until U.S. President Bill Clinton began normalizing diplomatic relations in the 1990s. In 1994, the U.S. lifted its 30-year trade embargo on Vietnam. The following year, both countries established embassies and consulates. Relations between the two countries continued to improve into the 21st century.

Vietnam is now considered to be a potential ally of the United States, especially in the geopolitical context of the territorial disputes in the South China Sea and in the containment of Chinese expansionism. Vietnam, one of the countries with the most favorable public opinion regarding the U.S., is the only communist country to have such a favorable view. Every U.S. president since diplomatic normalization in 1995 has visited Vietnam at least once, highlighting the importance of Vietnam in the U.S.'s growing pivot to Asia; these visits have been welcomed by the Vietnamese populace despite political differences.

Vietnamese Americans, making up more than 2.1 million people, are mostly immigrants who moved to the U.S. after the Vietnam War; they comprise nearly half of all overseas Vietnamese, but are mostly loyal to the fallen South Vietnamese government instead of the ruling communist government.

History

19th century
In 1829, U.S. President Andrew Jackson sent a diplomatic delegation led by Edmund Roberts on the USS Peacock to the Nguyễn dynasty to establish bilateral relations and expand trade between the two countries. The ship arrived in Vũng Lấm, Phú Yên province on 2 January 1833. The ruler of Vietnam at the time, Emperor Minh Mạng, was not eager to allow foreigners to freely enter Vietnam and engage in trade. The emperor required that Americans follow Vietnamese laws, and only allowed them to do business in Da Nang, Central Vietnam. After receiving this unwelcome message, Edmund Roberts and his delegation left Vietnam. The American-Vietnamese relationship remained frozen after many disagreements and tensions from 1836 to 1859. This lasted until 1873, when Vietnam had trouble fighting against the invading French forces in northern Vietnam. Emperor Tự Đức appointed Foreign Minister Bùi Viện as "Grand Emissary" and sent him to the United States to seek support and aid against the French Empire. The diplomatic delegation passed through Yokohama, Japan, then arrived in San Francisco in mid-1873. Bùi Viện and the Vietnamese emissaries traveled to Washington, D.C. and met with U.S. President Ulysses S. Grant, who promised aid and an alliance with Vietnam. However, the U.S. Congress cancelled Grant's intervention in Vietnam. In 1884, Vietnam was completely conquered by France, becoming French Indochina.

World War II 

The U.S. and Vietnam had informal relations during World War II, though this was not directly with French Indochina. Though the U.S. had good relations with the French Third Republic, after the latter fell to Nazi Germany in 1940, Germany established Vichy France, which took over administration of the French colonies, including French Indochina. Vichy France allowed the Empire of Japan to access French Indochina, and in July 1941 Japan extended its control to the whole of French Indochina.

During the Pacific War, American agents of the Office of Strategic Services, led by United States Army officer Archimedes Patti, arrived in Vietnam and met with the Viet Minh, a communist independence movement led by pro-American revolutionary Ho Chi Minh. The OSS and the Viet Minh cooperated together to fight Japanese forces in French Indochina, and the OSS trained the Viet Minh, who gave the OSS agents shelter. The People's Army of Vietnam, founded in 1944 in the mountains of northwest Vietnam, had been backed and supported by the OSS and trained by American military personnel, including Patti, who greatly respected the Vietnamese. The first commander of the PAVN was Võ Nguyên Giáp, who was trained under the watch of the Americans.

The relations between the Viet Minh and the OSS marked the beginning of American involvement in Vietnam. Later, Ho Chi Minh asked to set up an alliance with the United States, which was approved by U.S. President Franklin D. Roosevelt with support from U.S. General Dwight D. Eisenhower. However, relations were strained following further events in French Indochina, including the death of OSS officer A. Peter Dewey, who was shot by Viet Minh fighters during the 1945 Vietnam uprising; the Viet Minh claimed they mistook Dewey for a French soldier, and Ho Chi Minh reportedly apologized to the U.S. and ordered a search for Dewey's body, though Vietnamese historian Trần Văn Giàu reported that Dewey's body was dumped in a nearby river and was never recovered. After Harry S. Truman, a fervent anti-communist, took power following Roosevelt's death, a U.S.-Vietnam alliance was never established.

Vietnam War 

In the postcolonial wave following the end of World War II, the First Indochina War forced the French Fourth Republic out of French Indochina. In the 1954 Geneva Conference, French Indochina was dismantled and superseded by the independent states of North Vietnam, South Vietnam, Cambodia, and Laos. However, with the Cold War ongoing, the concern became political ideologies. Vietnam had been split into two opposing countries: North Vietnam, a communist country that fought the French and thus came into opposition with American ideals; and South Vietnam, a capitalist country that fought alongside the French and was generally in line with the U.S.' geopolitical outlook that communism had to be contained. The two countries were divided at the 17th parallel north, not unlike the 38th parallel north that divided North Korea and South Korea in the Korean War. The Geneva Conference provided that a general election be held by July 1956 to create a unified Vietnamese state, but they were not directly signed onto nor accepted by delegates of South Vietnam and the U.S., and South Vietnamese leader Ngo Dinh Diem refused to allow elections.

The U.S. supported South Vietnam, having already supported France during the First Indochina War. The U.S. sent American military advisors to train and assist the Army of the Republic of Vietnam, and spent massive amounts of money in efforts to modernize the country; however, this created tensions between the U.S. and North Vietnam. Tensions reached a breaking point following the 1964 Gulf of Tonkin incident, when the U.S. accused the Vietnam People's Navy of attacking the USS Maddox and other United States Navy vessels on two separate occasions. While the first incident barely damaged the USS Maddox and resulted in 10 Vietnamese casualties (4 killed and 6 wounded), the second incident was contentious, and was proven to not have happened in the 2000s. However, at the time, U.S. President Lyndon B. Johnson used both incidents as justification to take any necessary retaliatory measures; the U.S. Congress promptly passed the Gulf of Tonkin Resolution, which authorized the deployment of American forces in Vietnam.

The Gulf of Tonkin incident started American involvement in the Second Indochina War, known in the Western world as the "Vietnam War". For 11 years, the U.S, South Vietnam, and their allies fought North Vietnam, the Viet Cong, and their allies. Though the U.S. and South Vietnam used air superiority, close air support, and Central Intelligence Agency-led intelligence operations to their advantage, North Vietnam and the Viet Cong made use of guerrilla warfare, though their tactics gradually became more conventional as the war progressed. The Vietnam War was a massive undertaking for all involved: North Vietnam and the Viet Cong had around 690,000 soldiers by 1966, South Vietnam had a strength of 1.5 million soldiers by 1972, and the U.S. deployed a total of 2.7 million soldiers over the course of American involvement, peaking at 543,000 in April 1969. The U.S. spent roughly $140 billion ($950 billion in 2011) in direct expenses to South Vietnam to build infrastructure, train an army and police force, and modernize the country. Casualties and destruction caused by the war were immense, with the conflict killing between 1.3 million and 3.4 million people, a combined total of combatants and non-combatants from both sides. American society was greatly polarized by the war, which coincided with the height of the counterculture phenomenon and civil rights movement; opposition to American involvement in the Vietnam War was related to these movements, but was a major and significant movement in its own right. American sympathies toward and perspectives on Vietnam depended on political stance, and the U.S. government itself experienced divisions between pro-war and anti-war politicians.

To the United States, the Vietnam War was a Cold War conflict of political ideologies. Though the U.S. outwardly intervened in the interests of freedom, determination, and sovereignty, this was only when communism was not a major factor. However, North Vietnam was a communist country with relations to communist China and the Soviet Union, and was already surrounded and assisted by communist organizations elsewhere in Indochina such as the Khmer Rouge and the Pathet Lao, providing credence to the idea that communism was a global and monolithic force. By defeating North Vietnam, communist "tyranny and aggression" could be contained, and the security of Indochina could be preserved, with a unified Vietnam under Southern rule serving as a bulwark against communism in the region.

To North Vietnam, the war against the U.S. was simply an extension of their greater war for independence. In their view, the U.S. had merely replaced the French's role as another major-power colonialist obstacle to independence, Vietnamese reunification under Northern rule, and the rise of communism and postcolonial states in Indochina.

In 1969, with the Vietnam War becoming increasingly unpopular in the United States, U.S. President Richard Nixon enacted a plan of "Vietnamization", where U.S. military forces withdrew from combat roles and instead only provided intelligence, support, and logistics, with the end goal being a self-sufficient South Vietnam capable of fighting the conflict themselves. By 1972, U.S. forces had largely withdrawn, and their operations were limited to air support, artillery support, advisors, and materiel shipments. On 27 January 1973, the Paris Peace Accords were signed by the U.S., North Vietnam, South Vietnam, and Viet Cong representatives. The Accords called for a ceasefire, withdrawal of all U.S. forces, continuance in place of North Vietnamese troops in the South, and the eventual reunification of Vietnam "through peaceful means". In reality, once the last U.S. combat troops left Vietnam in March 1973, and the U.S. was effectively barred from providing military assistance in Indochina under the 1973 Case–Church Amendment, there was no effective way to prevent North Vietnam from overwhelming South Vietnam's defenses, and the Accords proved unenforceable.

North Vietnam and South Vietnam continued to fight for two more years, from 1973 to 1975, but South Vietnam, having to fight without the American support to which it had become accustomed, and lacking the financial support to pay its troops or supply them properly, suffered severe losses of personnel and territory to North Vietnamese forces. In March 1975, North Vietnamese General Võ Nguyên Giáp of North Vietnam, planning to test American resolution, sent General Văn Tiến Dũng to launch an attack on Buôn Ma Thuột; when the U.S. Congress blocked attempts to support South Vietnam, Giáp launched a full-scale invasion of South Vietnam, and by late April, North Vietnamese forces had surrounded the South Vietnamese capital of Saigon. The U.S. launched Operation Frequent Wind, sending U.S. Navy Task Force 76 to evacuate Saigon before North Vietnamese forces could capture the city, initially only to evacuate American embassy staff but eventually accepting South Vietnamese civilians and military personnel as they boarded evacuation flights or flew their own aircraft to the evacuation fleets, to the point that aircraft that were not being used had to be pushed off aircraft carriers to make space for more. In Operation Frequent Wind, a total of 1,373 Americans and 5,595 Vietnamese and third-country nationals were evacuated by helicopter, and the total number of Vietnamese evacuated by Frequent Wind or self-evacuated and ending up in the custody of the United States for processing as refugees to enter the United States totaled 138,869. Shortly after, North Vietnamese forces captured Saigon, ending the Vietnam War with a decisive North Vietnamese victory and initiating the reunification of Vietnam into the modern Socialist Republic of Vietnam. Saigon was renamed to Ho Chi Minh City, but the capital of Vietnam remained in Hanoi.

Agent Orange

"Agent Orange" was a herbicide and defoliant used by the U.S. as part of Operation Ranch Hand, a herbicidal warfare program initiated by the U.S. military. Developed from 1962 to 1971, Agent Orange consists of a fifty-fifty mixture of 2,4,5-T and 2,4-D, over 20 million gallons of it were produced by the U.S. over the course of the war. Agent Orange was primarily intended to destroy the foliage used as concealment by North Vietnamese soldiers.

The 2,4,5-T used to produce Agent Orange was later discovered to be contaminated with 2,3,7,8-Tetrachlorodibenzodioxin, an extremely toxic dioxin compound. Agent Orange's use led to the deaths of thousands of people, the destruction of over 3.1 million hectares (31,000 km2 or 11,969 mi2) of Vietnam's forests, and up to a million Vietnamese and Americans alike experiencing birth defects, disabilities, and health problems resulting from the toxic chemicals used in Agent Orange. The Viet Nam Red Cross Society estimates that up to 1 million people are disabled or have health problems due to the effects of Agent Orange, but the U.S. government has dismissed these figures as unreliable and unrealistically high.

Prisoners of war and missing soldiers 

Following American withdrawal from the Vietnam War in 1973, the U.S. listed about 2,500 Americans as prisoners of war (POW) or missing in action (MIA), but only 1,200 Americans were reported to have been killed in action with no body recovered. Only 591 American POWs were returned during Operation Homecoming in early 1973. Many American MIAs were pilots who were shot down over North Vietnam or Laos. Investigations of these incidents have involved determining whether the men involved survived being shot down; if they did not survive, then the U.S. government considers efforts to recover their remains. The U.S. POW and MIA issue greatly affected attempts at normalizing diplomatic ties between the U.S. and Vietnam in the aftermath of the Vietnam War

As of 2007, the U.S. government listed 1,763 Americans unaccounted for in Southeast Asia, including 1,353 in Vietnam. Since 1973, 883 Americans have been accounted for, including 627 in Vietnam. Additionally, the U.S. Department of Defense has confirmed that of the 196 individuals who were officially considered "last known alive", the U.S. government has determined the fate of all but 31. The U.S. considers achieving the fullest possible accounting of Americans missing and unaccounted for in Indochina to be one of its highest priorities with Vietnam.

Severance of diplomatic ties and attempts at normalization 
Following the Vietnam War, Vietnam pursued the establishment of diplomatic relations with the United States. This was initially to obtain US$3.3 billion in reconstruction aid, which U.S. President Richard Nixon had secretly promised after the Paris Peace Accords were signed, in the form of a letter offering a specific figure. In June 1975, Vietnamese Premier Phạm Văn Đồng, speaking to the National Assembly, invited the U.S. to normalize relations with Vietnam and to honor its commitment to provide reconstruction funds. Representatives of two American banks—the Bank of America and First National City Bank—were invited to Hanoi to discuss trade possibilities, and American oil companies were informed that they were welcome to apply for concessions to search for oil in Vietnamese waters.

However, the U.S. government neglected Đồng's call for normalized relations, because it was predicated on reparations, and the American political climate in the wake of the war precluded the pursuit of such an outcome. The U.S. also applied a trade embargo against Vietnam in 1975. In response to Vietnam, the administration of U.S. President Gerald Ford imposed its own precondition for normal relations by announcing that a full accounting of American POWs and MIA, including the return of any remains, would be required before normalization attempts. No concessions were made on either side until U.S. President Jimmy Carter softened the American demand from a full accounting to simply the fullest possible accounting, and dispatched a diplomatic mission to Vietnam in 1977 to initiate normalization discussions.

Although Vietnam was initially adamant about American economic assistance (their first postwar economic plan counted on the amount promised by President Nixon), the condition was dropped in mid-1978, when Vietnamese Foreign Minister Nguyễn Cơ Thạch and the U.S. government reached an agreement in principle on normalization, but the date was left vague. When Thạch urged November 1978, the U.S. government was noncommittal: at that time, the U.S. was preoccupied with a large influx in Vietnamese boat people, and they were already attempting to normalize relations with China; relations between Vietnam and China were strained at the time—eventually deteriorating into the Sino-Vietnamese War in 1979—and the U.S. did not wish to risk their relations with China by normalizing relations with one of China's enemies. The Vietnamese government responded by formalizing their relations with the Soviet Union. Their original hope, however, had been to gain both diplomatic recognition from the United States and a friendship treaty with the Soviet Union, as a double guarantee against future Chinese interference. In the U.S., the issue of normalizing relations with Vietnam was complicated by the Cambodian–Vietnamese War, the Vietnamese refugee crisis, and the unresolved POW and MIA issues, with U.S. President Ronald Reagan continuing to enforce the trade embargo and barring normalization as long as Vietnamese troops occupied Cambodia. Any efforts to improve relations remained closely tied to the U.S.' willingness to honor its 1973 aid commitment to Vietnam and Vietnam's failure to account for the whereabouts of American MIAs in Indochina.

Beginning in mid-1978, however, Vietnam dropped its insistence that the MIA and aid questions be resolved as a precondition for normalization, and stopped linking the MIA issue to other unresolved matters between the two countries. Vietnamese leaders contrasted their restraint on the MIA issue with its alleged political exploitation by the United States as a condition for normal relations. As additional signs of goodwill, Hanoi permitted the joint U.S.-Vietnamese excavation of a B-52 crash site in 1985, and returned the remains of a number of American service members between 1985 and 1987. Vietnamese spokesmen also claimed during this period to have a two-year plan to resolve the MIA question, but did not reveal details.

Although Vietnam's Sixth National Party Congress in December 1986 officially paid little attention to restoring diplomatic relations with the U.S., the report of the Congress noted that Vietnam was continuing to hold talks with the U.S. on humanitarian issues, and expressed a readiness to improve relations. Although ambivalent in tone, the message was more positive than the 1982 Fifth National Party Congress report, which had attributed the stalemated relationship to American "hostile policy." The improved wording was attributable to the influence of newly appointed Party General Secretary Nguyễn Văn Linh, who was expected to attach high priority to expanding Vietnam's links with the West. Despite signs of improvement, in mid-1987, the Vietnamese government, having determined that cooperation had gained few concessions from the U.S., reverted to its pre-1978 position linking the aid and MIA issues. However, a meeting between Vietnamese leaders and Reagan's special envoy on MIAs, General John William Vessey Jr., in August 1987 yielded significant gains for both sides: in exchange for greater Vietnamese cooperation on resolving the MIA issue, the U.S. agreed to officially encourage charitable assistance for Vietnam. Although the agreement fell short of Hanoi's requests for economic aid or war reparations, it marked the first time that the U.S. had offered anything in return for Vietnamese assistance in accounting for the MIAs, and was an important step toward rapprochement.

Rapprochement 
The influence of U.S. Senators John McCain and John Kerry on U.S. President Bill Clinton was instrumental in the U.S. government's 1994 decision to lift the trade embargo against Vietnam. Both Kerry and McCain were decorated veterans of the Vietnam War who served on the Senate Select Committee on P.O.W./M.I.A. Affairs. In this role, they became intimately familiar with the issue of American MIAs, frequently traveling to Vietnam and coordinating with Vietnamese government officials. Following years of controversy in the U.S. over the fate of MIAs, as well as measurable progress by the Vietnamese government in meeting related American demands, Kerry and McCain began to advocate lifting the embargo, believing the policy would foster binational reconciliation, post-Vietnam War healing in the U.S., and further American economic and security interests. According to then-Senator Ted Kennedy, “John Kerry did it because the issue of the war burned in his soul, and he found a soulmate in John McCain.” On many occasions, McCain and Kerry met personally with Clinton to promote lifting the embargo. In one conversation with Clinton, McCain stated, “It doesn’t matter to me anymore, Mr. President, who was for the war and who was against the war. I’m tired of looking back in anger. What’s important is that we move forward now.” In arguing their case to Clinton, the Senators “offered geopolitical and economic reasons, but also emphasized the matter of national honor, since the Vietnamese had diligently done all that we had asked them to in the matter of M.I.A [soldiers].”

The efforts of Kerry and McCain in the U.S. Congress and in the public sphere created the political capital and consensus necessary for the Clinton administration to lift the embargo. Although officials in the Clinton administration were ultimately in consensus to lift the embargo, the administration perceived they did not possess sufficient political credibility. Clinton had avoided military service in the Vietnam War as a young man, infamously describing the conflict in a letter in 1969 as “a war I opposed and despised with a depth of feeling I had reserved solely for racism in America before Vietnam.” Consequently, Kerry and McCain sought to use their widespread credibility on the matter to create an environment in which Clinton could lift the embargo. In 1993, Kerry and McCain accompanied Clinton to the Vietnam Veterans Memorial, despite substantial opposition from veterans’ groups. Moreover, the two men accompanied Clinton in 1993 “as his escorts” to “deliver the commencement address at Northeastern University.” Later, in 1994, Kerry and McCain co-sponsored a bipartisan Senate resolution urging the Clinton administration to lift the embargo. Despite significant opposition from Republican leadership and veterans’ groups, “McCain’s sponsorship persuaded twenty Republicans to vote for the measure, which passed by a vote of sixty-two to thirty-eight.” While developing the bill, Kerry was in frequent communication with officials within the Clinton administration. Following the vote, Kerry emphasized the promotion of national healing, stating, “it was time to put the war behind us.” Likewise, McCain described the resolution as “as a seminal event in U.S.-Vietnamese relations,” adding that “the vote will give the President the… political cover he needs to lift the embargo.”

The U.S. embargo on Vietnam was eventually lifted in February 1994. Formal normalization occurred in 1995, when both countries opened liaison offices that were later upgraded to formal embassies later in the year, with the U.S. later opening the Consulate General of the United States, Ho Chi Minh City, and Vietnam opening a consulate in San Francisco. In 1997, the Vietnamese government agreed to pay the debts of the South Vietnamese government, then amounting to $140 million, in order to be allowed to trade with the U.S.. Following this, trade volumes boomed between the two countries. Also in 1997, Clinton appointed former POW and U.S. Congressman Douglas "Pete" Peterson as the first U.S. Ambassador to Vietnam.

21st century 
The annual Bilateral Human Rights Dialogue resumed in 2006 after a two-year hiatus. The U.S. and Vietnam signed a Bilateral Trade Agreement in July 2000, which went into force in December 2001. In 2003, the two countries signed a Counternarcotics Letter of Agreement (amended in 2006), a Civil Aviation Agreement, and a textile agreement. In January 2007, Congress approved Permanent Normal Trade Relations (PNTR) for Vietnam. In July 2015, the United States hosted Vietnamese Communist Party General Secretary Nguyễn Phú Trọng in the first-ever visit of a Vietnamese Communist Party General Secretary to the United States following a concerted effort by the Obama administration to pursue warmer relations with Vietnam.

Human rights

Vietnam's suppression of political dissent and restrictions on freedom of speech have been an issue of contention in terms of Vietnam's relations with the United States, and Vietnam's actions against freedom of expression have drawn criticism from the U.S. government.

In spring 2007, Vietnam's government launched a crackdown on political dissidents, and in November of that year, Vietnamese authorities arrested a group of pro-democracy activists, including two Americans. Despite continued suppression of dissent and expression, Vietnam made significant progress on expanding freedom of religion in 2005, when Vietnam passed comprehensive religious freedom legislation, outlawing forced renunciations and permitting the official recognition of new denominations. As a result, in November 2006, the U.S. Department of State lifted the designation of Vietnam as a “Country of Particular Concern,” based on a determination that the country was no longer a serious violator of religious freedoms, as defined by the International Religious Freedom Act of 1998. This decision was reaffirmed by the Department of State in November 2007. However, serious concerns continue due to Vietnam's suppression of freedom of speech.

U.S. President Donald Trump was criticized for not mentioning human rights issues in Vietnam during his visit to Vietnam in 2017 and before the visit of Vietnamese Premier Nguyễn Xuân Phúc to the United States.

Transport
In December 2003, the United States and Vietnam signed a Bilateral Air Transport Agreement. Several U.S. carriers already have third-party code sharing agreements with Vietnam Airlines. Direct flights between Ho Chi Minh City and San Francisco began in December 2004. Vietnam and the United States also signed a bilateral Maritime Agreement in March 2007 that opened the maritime transport and services industry of Vietnam to U.S. firms. In 2011 the U.S. banks agreed to invest $1.5 billion in Vietnamese infrastructure.

Military

According to the Council on Foreign Relations, Vietnam's defense policy is based on the "Four 'No's" principle: no military alliances, no foreign troops stationed on Vietnamese soil, no partnering with a foreign power to combat another, and no force or threatening to use force in international relations. This was historically "Three 'No's"; however, the fourth, denouncing the use of force, was added in the December 2019 "National Defense White Paper", which also stated that Vietnam is willing to allow ships from other countries to dock at its ports. Cooperation between the United States and Vietnam in other areas, such as defense, nonproliferation, counterterrorism, and law enforcement, is expanding steadily.

The territorial disputes in the South China Sea with China, which has become more assertive in its territorial claims, has also gradually strengthened relations between Vietnam, the U.S., and other Chinese rivals, including India and fellow ASEAN member and U.S. ally the Philippines. The U.S. favors an open South China Sea for its larger Indo-Pacific strategy and because Chinese territorial claims in the region threaten the security and prosperity of its key regional allies. With Vietnam's historically complex relationship with China that included past territorial disputes, Vietnam feels that Chinese claims and actions in the South China Sea threaten its sovereignty and territorial integrity. In this regard, American and Vietnamese security interests align as they oppose Chinese in the South China Sea.

Vietnam hosted visits by five U.S. Navy vessels in 2007, including a port call to Da Nang by the amphibious assault ship  carrying a multinational contingent of medical and engineering personnel. In June 2007, Vietnamese observers took part for the first time in the multinational naval exercise Cooperation Afloat Readiness and Training (CARAT), organized by the U.S. Navy. Vietnamese Prime Minister Nguyễn Tấn Dũng stated that the country is in the final stages of preparation to take part in international peacekeeping, as part of its contribution as a new member of the United Nations Security Council.

When asked about the killing of Osama bin Laden in 2011, Nguyen Phuong Nga, a spokeswoman for the Foreign Ministry of Vietnam, agreed with American counterterrorism measures, saying, "Terrorists must bear responsibility for their acts and should be severely punished. Vietnam will continue to join the international community in the fight against terrorism, based on the UN Charter and the basic principles of international law, to eliminate terrorism."

In April 2013, following increased tensions between Vietnamese fishing vessels and the China Coast Guard, which peaked a month prior after a Chinese warning flare accidentally set a Vietnamese fishing boat ablaze, the Vietnam People's Navy and U.S. Coast Guard cooperated to improve security in Vietnamese waters and resolve confrontations between Vietnamese fishers and Chinese vessels.

In June 2013, Vietnamese Prime Minister Nguyễn Tấn Dũng said in a speech at the Shangri-La Dialogue in Singapore that he would welcome the U.S. playing a larger role in tempering regional tensions, as China and some of its Southeast Asian neighbors remain deadlocked over competing territorial claims in the South China Sea, saying, "No regional country would oppose the strategic engagement of extra-regional powers if such engagement aims to enhance cooperation for peace, stability and development. We attach special importance to the roles played by a vigorously rising China and by the United States — a Pacific power."

In October 2013, the United States and Vietnam signed a pact allowing for the transfer of nuclear fuel and technology from the U.S. to Vietnam, which is already working with Russia to complete its first nuclear plant by 2014 to meet its rising energy demands, with an American official noting that, "Vietnam is actively taking steps now toward development of a robust domestic infrastructure to support a nuclear energy program." In line with its more active engagement with Vietnam, the U.S. has provided funds and equipment for Vietnamese naval capabilities. In 2013, Secretary of State John Kerry announced that the U.S. would provide Vietnam with $18 million to enhance the capacity of its coast guard.

Additionally, the U.S. and Vietnam also cooperate in the Clean Energy Sector. In 2014, the U.S. Ambassador to Vietnam announced the U.S. was providing technical assistance for developing wind power systems in Vietnam.

In early October 2014, the U.S. approved a relaxation of its longstanding arms embargo on Vietnam. In May 2016, President Obama announced the full lifting of the embargo during his visit to Vietnam.

On 2 October 2016, U.S. Navy destroyer  and submarine tender  made the first port visit to Cam Ranh Bay since 1975. A U.S. Navy aircraft carrier visited Vietnam in March 2018. According to the Vietnam Foreign Ministry, the visit would "contribute to maintaining peace, stability, security, cooperation and development in the region".

In May 2017, the U.S. delivered six 45-foot Defiant-class patrol boats to the Vietnam Coast Guard. The cooperation in matters of their naval capabilities suggests that the shared security concerns over the South China Sea has strengthened the U.S.-Vietnam military relationship.

The U.S.-Vietnam defense relationship, however, is limited by historical memory and Vietnam's multivector foreign policy. While fears about regime change have lowered, the U.S.' frequent criticism of Vietnam's human rights situation is understood in the context of the Vietnam War and creates worry in Vietnam about the U.S.' true intentions. This may serve to limit the scope and scale of military cooperation. Similarly, with its multivector foreign policy, Vietnam avoids aligning too closely with any particular regional power, and in particular limits its engagement with the U.S. to avoid upsetting China. To that end, Russia, not the U.S., is the largest arms exporter to Vietnam.

Diplomatic missions
The U.S. Embassy in Vietnam is located in Hanoi. The U.S. Consulate General is located in Ho Chi Minh City. The Vietnamese Consulate General to the U.S. is located in San Francisco, California. In 2009, the United States received permission to open a consulate in Da Nang; in 2010, Vietnam officially inaugurated a consulate general in Houston.

Principal U.S. officials
 Ambassador – Marc Knapper
 Consul General – Marie C. Damour

Of Vietnam
Washington, D.C. (Embassy)
San Francisco (Consulate)
New York City (Consulate)
Houston (Consulate)

Of the United States
Hanoi (Embassy)
Ho Chi Minh City (Consulate)

See also

U.S.-Vietnam Dialogue Group on Agent Orange/Dioxin
U.S.-South Vietnam relations
U.S. Military Assistance Command in Vietnam
Vietnamese Americans

References
General

Specific

Further reading

 Demmer, Amanda C. After Saigon's Fall: Refugees and US-Vietnamese Relations, 1975–2000 (Cambridge University Press,  2021, focus on restoration of relations.
 Matray, James I. ed. East Asia and the United States: An Encyclopedia of relations since 1784 (2 vol. Greenwood, 2002). excerpt v 2

External links
 History of Vietnam - U.S. relations
 Fallout of the War from the Dean Peter Krogh Foreign Affairs Digital Archives
 Vietnam visa for U.S citizens

 
Vietnam
Bilateral relations of Vietnam